The principle of moral supervenience states that moral predicates (e.g., permissible, obligatory, forbidden, etc.) supervene upon non-moral predicates, and hence that moral facts involving these predicates (like stealing is wrong) supervene upon non-moral facts. The moral facts are hence said to be supervenient facts, and the non-moral facts the supervenience base of the former. The principle is sometimes qualified to say that moral facts supervene upon natural facts, i.e., observable, empirical facts within space-time, but a broader conception could allow the supervenience base to include any non-moral facts, including (if there are any) non-natural facts (e.g., divine commands, Platonic truths).

Moral supervenience can be applied to anything which can be the subject of a moral judgment. For example, we often say that actions are right or wrong, permissible or impermissible, etc. But we can also say that a person's character is virtuous or vicious, or that a situation or result is morally good or bad.

Clarification and examples 

Another way to put this is to say that moral facts are a function of, depend upon, or are constrained or constituted by, some non-moral facts, and that the latter are a sufficient condition for making the moral facts true. Another common way of putting this is that any change in moral facts must be accompanied by a change in the non-moral facts (i.e., those on which it supervenes), but that the reverse is not the case. A moral fact can supervene on more than one set of non-moral facts-i.e., it is multiply realizable-but any given set of non-moral facts determines the moral facts which supervene upon it.

Not all non-moral predicates are typically thought to be relevant to the application of a moral predicate. For instance, whether a particular killing was done in self-defense or in order to facilitate a robbery is probably relevant to whether it is wrong. But whether it happens in Greenland or England, or in the morning or at night, is not relevant. The principle of moral supervenience does not tell us which such facts are relevant, however; it only says that whichever ones are relevant, are relevant wherever they appear. For instance, if it was wrong for Sam to kill Alice while he was robbing her, and it was wrong because it was done in order to rob her, then if Brenda kills Charles while robbing him is wrong for the same reason. It is impossible for one such killing to be wrong and another right unless they also differ in one or more relevant circumstances.

Of course, there could be additional relevant circumstances; if Charles had previously enslaved Brenda for several years, and she finds an opportunity to escape to freedom but needs his car to do so, and knows that he will pursue and kill her if he remains alive, then her killing of Charles may be permissible. And there could be yet further circumstances which change the moral quality of this killing. But whatever the total relevant non-moral facts are (i.e., that Brenda killed Charles during a robbery, and she was not previous enslaved, etc.), then if the principle of moral supervenience is true, then any other killing where those same non-moral facts are true has the same moral properties as Brenda's killing of Charles. For instance, it is not possible for Brenda's killing of Charles to be right, and Sam's killing of Alice to be wrong, just because Brenda is not Sam. R.M. Hare put this point by saying that the supervenience base of a moral fact could not include "individual constants" (including proper names of persons, countries, etc.) One could of course claim that the fact that Brenda is called Brenda, or is a woman rather than a man, is relevant to the morality of her killing; while implausible, this claim would not be ruled out by the principle of moral supervenience, but by other more substantive moral principles. Hence, the moral supervenience is only a very weak constraint on morality.

Relationship to Moral Particularism 

The principle is compatible with a very fine-grained analysis of the supervenience base for moral predicates, and hence is compatible with moral particularism, which claims that whatever non-moral facts make a certain action right or wrong, it is possible that some additional non-moral facts could change that non-moral fact again. For instance, in the above example, Brenda's having been previously enslaved by Charles might making killing him permissible; but if Brenda has been a terrorist imprisoned by Charles to prevent her from committing more violence, then her killing him would instead be impermissible. But yet further circumstances added to this might make her terrorism permissible again (i.e., if Charles was a vicious tyrant whose rule was impervious to anything but a terrorist act). And so forth-perhaps there is no end to the possible circumstances we could add to any given set which would once again change the moral qualities of the act. But again, moral supervenience is compatible with all these claims, for it simply says that if there were another act done by a person with the same non-moral qualities-howsoever complex-which made one act, say, wrong, then that second act is also wrong.

Hare, in the first recorded usage of the term moral particularism, defined these as incompatible, saying they were contradictories, but his definition of particularism is not identical with its contemporary usage. Hare used it to refer to the possibility that two persons committing acts with the same natural properties could have different moral properties simply because the acts were done by different persons, which by definition is simply the denial of moral supervenience as he understood it.)

History 

Moral supervenience is a kind of moral universalizability principle, like the golden rule or Immanuel Kant's categorical imperative, so the underlying idea may be as old as the golden rule. Moral supervenience differs from most other universalizability principles in that it adds no specific criterion for the supervenience base of permissible behaviors, so it cannot function as a comprehensive test for moral permissibility, as most other universalizability principles purport to do.

The earliest precise specification of the principle may be found in Samuel Clarke's "Rule of Equity" according to which "Whatever I judge reasonable or unreasonable that another should do for me: that by the same judgment I declare reasonable or unreasonable that I should in the like case do for him." A few years later William Wollaston echoed this claim with the principle that "Whatever is either reasonable or unreasonable in B with respect to C, would be just the same in C with respect to B, if the case was inverted. Because reason is universal and respects cases, not persons." A few years later Richard Cumberland restated this as a requirement of "right reason," which entailed that “It is included in the notion of a true proposition, (a practical one, for instance,) and is consequently a necessary perfection of a man forming a right judgment in that affair; that it should agree with other true propositions framed about a like subject, tho that case should happen at another time, or belong to another man.... Whoever therefore judges truly, must judge the same things, which he thinks truly are lawful to himself, to be lawful in others in a like case. " Later versions are found in Reid, Moore, Sidgwick, and Sharp.

The first usage of the general term "supervenience" and the specific term "moral supervenience" in print was by R.M. Hare, although he later suggested that the former term was used by other philosophers conversationally before he put them both into print. While Hare was primarily interested in the supervenience of moral concepts on non-moral ones, he also argued that other evaluative concepts, e.g., aesthetic ones like beautiful, pleasant, nice, etc., must also supervene upon non-moral facts. For instance, it is senseless to call one room "nice" and another "not nice" unless there is some underlying difference between them describable in non-aesthetic terms (like the arrangement of the furniture, color of the walls, etc.) If the two rooms are identical in all their non-aesthetic properties, then they must also be identical in their aesthetic ones.

In a series of later books, Hare made moral supervenience, combined with the criterion that a rational being would prefer the satisfaction of his preferences over their frustration, the basis of his idea of universal prescriptivism. From this he derived a version of utilitarianism, by arguing that to prescribe a particular action in one's circumstances was only rational if you would prescribe anyone's else's doing it, even if you were equally likely to be any agent (including all those affected, for good or ill, by the action). This would only be true if, were you to personally experience all the good and bad effects of the action upon all affected persons (i.e., the satisfaction and frustration of their preferences), you would not prefer some other action to the one in question. He often simply called moral supervenience "universalizability" and equated it with Kant's principle of universal law, although the two are not the same (see moral universalizability).

References

Bibliography 

Concepts in ethics
Philosophy articles needing expert attention